Peter M. Ward (5 November 1876 – 9 February 1943) was a New Zealand-born rugby union player who represented Australia.

A fly-half, he was born in Invercargill.

Ward was described as "astute and a skillful inside back".

A member of the Britannia club Ward initially played for the Southland province between 1897 and 1898. He then moved to Sydney, Australia in 1899 and joined the Marrackville club. He was selected for New South Wales to play in their two matches against the touring Great Britain side. After this he claimed a total of four international rugby caps for the Australia. His Test debut was against Great Britain, at Sydney, on 24 June 1899, the inaugural rugby Test match played by an Australian national representative side. 

Due to funding constraints he was one of only six New South Wales players (Charlie Ellis, Hyram Marks, Lonnie Spragg, Bob McCowan, and Robert Challoner were the others) selected to make the trip to Brisbane four weeks later for the second Test. His performance in that match was noted as "excellent" by the press.

Ward had moved back to New Zealand by 1903, linking back with Britannia and Southland for one final year. He moved up to Auckland and joined the Grafton club for the 1904 season. He further played for the provinces of Hawke's Bay in 1905, Taranaki in 1906 and Wanganui in 1908 playing for the Napier City, Waimate and Awarua clubs respectively.

References

Further reading
 
 

Australian rugby union players
Australia international rugby union players
1876 births
1943 deaths
Rugby union players from Invercargill
20th-century deaths
Rugby union fly-halves